The Halland Regiment, designations I 16 and I 16/Fo 31, was a Swedish Army infantry regiment that traced its origins back to the 16th century. The regiment's soldiers were originally recruited from the provinces of Västergötland and Dalsland, but it was later garrisoned in Halland. The unit was disbanded as a result of the disarmament policies set forward in the Defence Act of 2000.

History 
The regiment has its origins in fänikor (companies) raised in Västergötland and Dalsland in the 16th century. In 1615, these units were organised by Gustav II Adolf into Västergötlands storregemente. Västergötlands storregemente consisted of three field regiments, of which Västgöta-Dals Regiment was one. Sometime between 1621 and 1624, the grand regiment was permanently split into three smaller regiments, of which Västgöta-Dals Regiment was one.

Västgöta-Dals Regiment was one of the original 20 Swedish infantry regiments mentioned in the Swedish constitution of 1634. The regiment's first commander was Wilhelm von Salzburg. It was allotted in 1685. The regiment was given the designation I 16 (16th Infantry Regiment) in a general order in 1816.

In 1902 the regiment changed recruitment area to Halland and was garrisoned in Halmstad. The name was changed to Halland Regiment to reflect this. In 1975, the regiment gained the new designation I 16/Fo 31 as a consequence of a merge with the local defence district Fo 31. The regiment was disbanded in 2000.

Campaigns 
The Polish War (1600–1629)
The Thirty Years' War (1630–1648)
The Northern Wars (1655–1661)
The Scanian War (1674–1679)
The Great Northern War (1700–1721)
The Seven Years' War (1757–1762)
The Gustav III's Russian War (1788–1790)
The Franco-Swedish War (1805–1810)
The Finnish War (1808–1809)
The Campaign against Norway (1814)

Organisation 

1685(?)
Livkompaniet
Överstelöjtnantens kompani
Majorens kompani
Sun- och Nordals kompani
Tössbo kompani
Kållands kompani
Vedbo kompani
Kullings kompani

1814(?)
Livkompaniet
Forssa kompani
Järvsö kompani
Delsbo kompani
Färnebo kompani
Arbrå kompani
Alfta kompani
Ovansjö kompani

Heraldry and traditions

Colours, standards and guidons
On 7 June 1952, the regimentet was presented with the first colour with the provincial badge of Halland. The 1952 colour was presented by Prince Bertil, Duke of Halland. Until 1952, the colours of the regiment had been the colour of Västergötland (black and yellow), though the regiment since 1906 was located in province of Halland. When the regiment received the "Hallandian" colour, the colour of Halland (blue and white) was adopted. The last regimental colour was presented to the regiment (I 16/Fo 31) in Halmstad by the Chief of Army Staff, lieutenant general Åke Sagrén on 7 July 1994. It was used as regimental colour by I 16/Fo 31 until 1 July 2000. The colour is drawn by Bengt Olof Kälde and embroidered by machine in insertion technique by the company Libraria. Blazon: "On blue cloth the provincial badge of Halland; a white lion rampant, armed red. On a white border at the upper side of the colour, battle honours (Lützen 1632, Leipzig 1642, Lund 1676, Gadebusch 1712) i blue."

Coat of arms
The coat of the arms of the Halland Regiment (I 16/Fo 31) 1977–1994 and the Halland Brigade (IB 16) 1994–2000. Blazon: "Azure, the provincial badge of Halland, a double-tailed lion rampant argent, armed and langued gules. The shield surmounted two muskets in saltire or". The coat of arms of the Halland Regiment (I 16/Fo 31) 1994–2000 and the Halland Group since 2000. Blazon: "Azure, the provincial badge of Halland, a double-tailed lion rampant argent, armed and langued gules. The shield surmounted two swords in saltire or".

Medals
The medal ribbon is of blue moiré with a black stripe on the middle followed on each side by a yellow stripe, then a white stripe and last a red line.

Heritage
The Halland Group is the traditional keeper of the regimental heritage and traditions, and organizes under the Air Defence Regiment (Lv 6). The Halland Group took over the colour and traditions in connection with the disbandment of the regiment and the brigade on 30 June 2000. From 1 July 2013, the traditions of the regiment will be continued by Halland Battalion, part of the Halland Group.

Other
Rudolf Petersson, creator of the comic  ("A military man's experiences and adventures"), now 91:an, made his military service at Halland Regiment which is the model for Klackamo Heath, where Mandel Karlsson, 87:an Axelsson and the others in the 91:an comic book did their military service.

Commanding officers
Regimental commanders active at the regiment 1924–2000. Göran Cunnighame was the first to be named regimental commander.

Commanders

10 March 1624: Welham von Salzburg (acting)
1625–1632: Göran Cunnighame
1632–1651: Nils Kagg
1651–1657: Johan Stake
1657–1660: Gustaf Oxenstierna
1660–1680: Vilhelm Jernsköld
1680–1691: David Macklier
1691–1705: Johan Fägerskiöld
1705–1716: Georg Reinhold Patkull 
1710–1712: N Palmfelt (acting)
1713–1716: B C Wulfrath (acting)
1716–1732: Libert Rosenstierna
1732–1735: Johan Fredrik Didron
1735–1745: Karl Ollonberg
1745–1749: Karl Lillie
1749–1766: Erik Lybecker
1766–1769: Ulrik Scheffer
1769–1769: Klaes Kristoffer Ekeblad
1769–1770: Karl Gustav Strömschiöld
1770–1773: Joen Filip Klingspor
1773–1779: Abraham Daniel Schönström
1779–1785: Fredrik Posse
1785–1793: Gustav Cronhielm
1793–1796: Gustav Lewenhaupt
1796–1811: Karl Bunge
1811–1816: Carl Löwenhielm
1816–1817: Gustav Fredrik Vilhelm Gyllenram
1817–1838: Wilhelm Albrecht Dorchimont
1838–1847: Axel Vilhelm Ehrengranat
1847–1853: Polykarpus Erik Cronhielm
1853–1864: Klaes Samuel Sandels
1864–1871: Lage Evald Posse
1871–1882: Eggert Elers
1882–1890: Otto Taube
1890–1890: Pontus Henrik Vilhelm Reuterswärd
1890–1894: Karl Oskar Unaeus
1894–1902: Otto Vilhelm Löwenborg (namnbyte)
1902–1909: Karl Vilhelm Emanuel Ankarcrona
1909–1917: Emil Mörcke
1917–1926: Peter Hegardt
1926–1932: Reinhold Geijer
1932–1937: Gösta Bratt
1937–1938: Colonel Axel Gyllenkrook
1938–1940: Nils Bildt
1941–1944: Ivar Lindqvist
1944–1947: Henrik Wrede
1947–1951: M Hedenlund
1951–1954: P Lande
1954–1957: Carl Klingenstierna
1957–1959: Colonel Arne Mohlin
1959–1960: Colonel Tage Olihn
1960–1968: Nils Juhlin
1968–1976: Lage Wernstedt
1976–1980: Senior colonel Carl-Gustaf Tiselius
1980–1983: Gustaf Malmström
1983–1988: R Morell
1988–1993: G Wetterlundh
1993–1995: P Källström
1995–1996: P Jonsson
1996–1998: Mats Welff
1998–2000: Arne Hedman

Deputy commanders
1976–19??: Colonel Arne Månsson

Names, designations and locations

See also
List of Swedish infantry regiments

Footnotes

References

Notes

Print

Further reading

Infantry regiments of the Swedish Army
Disbanded units and formations of Sweden
Military units and formations established in 1624
Military units and formations disestablished in 1713
Military units and formations established in 1713
Military units and formations disestablished in 2000
1624 establishments in Sweden
2000 disestablishments in Sweden
Halmstad Garrison